is a Prefectural Natural Park in Yamanashi Prefecture, Japan. The park is wholly within the municipality of Ichikawamisato.

See also
 National Parks of Japan

References

External links
  Map of Shibireko Prefectural Natural Park

Parks and gardens in Yamanashi Prefecture
Protected areas established in 1959
1959 establishments in Japan